Oppo phones are smartphones produced by the partially state-owned Chinese company Oppo, running in several countries.

Oppo F Series 

The Oppo F Series are MediaTek or Qualcomm powered selfie-centered devices in which OPPO used their tagline "Selfie Expert".

Oppo A Series 
Oppo A series are Oppo's budget to entry-level mid-range smartphones.

Oppo Find Series

Find 5 
The Oppo Find 5 was released in America in February 2013. It featured clean lines, a thin rectangular shape, and an overall elegant appearance. The Oppo Find 5 had a pixel density of 441 ppm, which puts it in the highest range of the mobile phones with HD display at its release time. In July 2013, a refreshed Oppo Find 5 launched in China. The processor has been changed to Snapdragon 600 instead of the Snapdragon S4 Pro. The Android version was updated to Android 4.2.2 as well while other specifications remained the same.

Find 7 
The Oppo Find 7 is a phablet with 3GB of RAM and a 2.5  GHz Quad-Core processor. The Oppo Find 7 is also available in another variant called the Find 7a, which has a 1080p screen and 2GB of RAM compared to the Find 7, which sports higher specs. It was announced on 19 March 2014 and released in April 2014. It is similar in design to the OnePlus One released in April 2014.

Find X 

The Oppo Find X was launched on 19 June 2018 at Paris. The Find X features a design that is different from traditional smartphone designs. A pop up camera allows it to be a full screen smartphone with minimal bezels. It is powered by Qualcomm Snapdragon 845 processor and it operates on Android 8.1 (Oreo) with ColorOS 5.1.

Find X2 

The Oppo Find X2 & X2 Pro were launched globally on 6 March 2020, featuring the Qualcomm Snapdragon 865 processor, 65W SuperVOOC 2.0 Flash Charge, and on the Find X2 Pro, 10X hybrid zoom.

Find X3

Find N 

The Oppo Find N was released in December 2021. It was the world's first foldable with a creaseless display and with no gap. It also followed the footsteps of Samsung, with its ultra-thin-glass display on the main screen.

Find X5 

The Find X4 was skipped to the Find X5 as the number 4 in Chinese sounds like 'death'. The Find X5 Series was released on 24 February 2022. The Oppo Find X5 reuses the Snapdragon 888 chipset from 2021 while Find X5 Pro has the new Snapdragon 8 Gen 1 chipset (In China, the pro model uses Mediatek dimensity 9000 processor.) Both phones have no micro lens which was found on previous Find X3 phones (excluding Find X3 Lite and Neo models). An affordable version was also released, the Find X5 Lite aka Oppo Reno 7 5G. It has the same selfie camera, has microsd and a headphone jack that the flagship brothers do not have but has no stereo speaker, no telephoto lens and no wireless charging.

Oppo N Series

N1 

On 23 September 2013, Oppo announced the N1, which has a 5.9″ 1080p display (373 ppi), 1.7 GHz Qualcomm Snapdragon 600 processor,  3,610mAh battery, 16GB or 32GB of storage, 2GB RAM, and a 13MP camera that can rotate, touch-panel on the back, and option to flash CyanogenMod. It was released in December 2013.

N3 
A successor, the Oppo N3, is priced at $449 as of early 2016. The N3 has a slightly smaller 5.5" Full HD screen compared to 5.9" screen on the N1. It also has more powerful specs with Qualcomm Snapdragon 801 processor with 3GB of RAM and 32GB of storage. The Oppo N3 has a rotate 16MP camera with Schneider lens which can rotate 180° to the front as selfie camera. It runs on Android 4.4 KitKat with customized ColorOS 2.1 UI. The N3 has a 3000mAh battery and a fingerprint scanner on the back.

Oppo R Series 
The OPPO R Series focuses on camera photography. The Oppo R Series was discontinued on 2019 and was replaced by the Oppo Reno Series.

Oppo K Series 
The Oppo K Series is a new smartphone series by Oppo which focuses on gaming devices. The first phone that will be launched on the K Series is the Oppo K1.

Oppo K1 
The Oppo K1 was announced at Oppo's special event in China on October 10, 2018. It features the Water-drop notch design language of Oppo and Vivo phones and an under-display fingerprint sensor. Its main difference from the other Oppo series is its chipset, sporting a Snapdragon 660 processor. Oppo K1 comes with 6.41-inch Full HD+ AMOLED display. It also has 4GB RAM and 64GB storage. The phone features 16 MP + 2 MP dual camera along with 25 MP selfie camera. It also packs a 3600 mAh battery.

Oppo K3 
The Oppo K3 was officially released on May, 2019, but made available to buy on July 23 via Amazon in India. The phone features 6.5-inch full-screen FHD+ AMOLED and waterdrop notch. Besides, the K3 shares similar design, hardware specs and software to Realme X, the Snapdragon 710 SoC, ColorOS 6.0 based on Android 9.0 Pie and under-display fingerprint scanner. It comes with either 6 or 8 GB RAM, and 64 or 128 GB storage. There's a dual-camera 16 MP + 2 MP setup on the back and 16 MP motorized pop-up camera on the front. It packs a 3765mAh battery with VOOC 3.0 fast charging tech.

Oppo K5 
The Oppo K5 was announced on October 10, 2019. The phone features a 6.4" AMOLED screen with Full HD+ resolution with 19.5:9 aspect ratio. It also features an under-display fingerprint scanner. Oppo K5 is powered by the Qualcomm Snapdragon 730G processor with 6 or 8GB of RAM and 128/256GB of storage, packing a 4000mAh battery with VOOC 4.0 30W fast charging, which can charged from 0 to 67% in 30 minutes and fully charged in 73 minutes. It also has a quad-camera setup of 64MP + 8MP + 2MP + 2MP and a 32MP selfie camera on the waterdrop notch. The K5 runs Android 9.0 Pie with customized ColorOS 6.1 UI.

Oppo K7 5G 
Oppo K7 5G is a smartphone first announced on 4 August 2020. It has a 6.4" FHD AMOLED display. Oppo K7 5G uses an octa-core, 2.4 GHz, 7 nm Snapdragon 765G processor. The smartphone comes with 8 GB of RAM, and either 128 or 256 GB of storage. The primary camera is 48 megapixels, accompanied by an 8 MP ultrawide camera, a 2 MP depth sensor, and a 2 MP monochrome camera. The primary front camera is 32 MP. The battery size is 4200 mAh.

Oppo K7x 
Oppo K7x is a smartphone first announced on 4 November 2020. It has a 6.5" FHD IPS display running at a 90 Hz refresh rate. Oppo K7x uses an octa-core, 2.0 GHz, 7 nm Dimensity 720 processor. The smartphone comes with either 6 or 8 GB of RAM, and either 128 or 256 GB of storage. The primary camera is 48 megapixels, accompanied by an 8 MP ultrawide camera, a 2 MP depth sensor, and a 2 MP macro camera. The primary front camera is 16 MP. The battery size is 5000 mAh.

Oppo K9 
Oppo K9 is a smartphone first announced on 6 May 2021. It has a 6.43" FHD AMOLED display running at a 90 Hz refresh rate. Oppo K9 uses an octa-core, 2.8 GHz, 7 nm Snapdragon 768G processor. The smartphone comes with 8 GB of RAM, and either 128 or 256 GB of storage. The primary camera is 64 megapixels, accompanied by an 8 MP ultrawide camera, and a 2 MP macro camera. The primary front camera is 32 MP. The battery size is 4300 mAh.

Oppo K9 Pro 
Oppo K9 Pro is a smartphone first announced on 26 September 2021. It has a 6.43" FHD AMOLED display running at a 120 Hz refresh rate. Oppo K9 Pro uses an octa-core, 3.0 GHz, 6 nm Dimensity 1200 processor. The smartphone comes with 8/12 GB of RAM, and either 128 or 256 GB of storage. The primary camera is 64 megapixels, accompanied by an 8 MP ultrawide camera, and a 2 MP macro camera. The primary front camera is 32 MP. The battery size is 4500 mAh.

Oppo K9s 
Oppo K9s is a smartphone first announced on 20 October 2021. It has a 6.59" FHD IPS LCD display running at a 120 Hz refresh rate. Oppo K9s uses an octa-core, 2.4 GHz, 6 nm Snapdragon 778G processor. The smartphone comes with either 6 or 8 GB of RAM, and either 128 or 256 GB of storage. The primary camera is 64 megapixels, accompanied by an 8 MP ultrawide camera, and a 2 MP macro camera. The primary front camera is 16 MP. The battery size is 5000 mAh.

Oppo K9x 
Oppo K9x is a smartphone first announced on 23 December 2021. It has a 6.49" FHD IPS LCD display running at a 90 Hz refresh rate. Oppo K9x uses an octa-core, 2.4 GHz, 6 nm Dimensity 810 processor. The smartphone comes with either 6 or 8 GB of RAM, and either 128 or 256 GB of storage. The primary camera is 64 megapixels, accompanied by an 2 MP depth camera, and a 2 MP macro camera. The primary front camera is 16 MP. The battery size is 5000 mAh.

Oppo K10 
Oppo K10 is a smartphone first announced on 23 March 2022. It has a 6.59" FHD IPS LCD display running at a 90 Hz refresh rate. Oppo K10 uses an octa-core, 2.4 GHz, 6 nm Snapdragon 680 processor. The smartphone comes with 6 or 8 GB of RAM, and 128 GB of storage. The primary camera is 50 megapixels, accompanied by an 2 MP macro camera, and a 2 MP depth sensor. The primary front camera is 16 MP. The battery size is 5000 mAh.

Oppo Reno Series 
The Oppo Reno Series smartphone series by Oppo focuses on Portrait Photography. It was the successor of Oppo R Series.

Oppo Reno 

In May 2019, Oppo released the Reno. The Oppo Reno has a 6.6-inch FHD+ AMOLED Display which is protected by Gorilla Glass 6. The phone is powered by Qualcomm Snapdragon 855 Soc which is coupled with 8GB ram and 256GB internal storage. As for the software, the phone came with Android 9.0 which is customized by the layer of ColorOS 6. In photographic section it has 48 MP + 13 MP + 8 MP rear camera along with 16 MP motorized pop-up for selfies.

Oppo Reno2 

In October 2019, Oppo has revealed the second-generation of the Oppo Reno line-up phones, the Reno 2, Reno 2F along with India-exclusive Reno 2Z. The Reno 2 series has the same panoramic screen design. Reno 2 has an 6.55" Full HD+ Sunlight AMOLED display with Qualcomm Snapdragon 730G processor, 8GB of RAM and 256GB of Storage. It also has a quad-camera setup with a main 48MP Sony IMX586 sensor + 13MP + 8MP + 2MP. The Reno 2F has a 6.5" Full HD+ AMOLED display, powered by mid-range Mediatek Helio P70 processor with same amount of RAM and 128GB of storage. It has a quad camera system with primary 48MP + 8MP + 2MP + 2MP. The Reno 2Z has a waterdrop 6.5" Full HD+ AMOLED display, powered by Mediatek Helio P90 chipset with 8GB of RAM with 128GB of storage. All three phones have a 16MP selfie camera and 4000mAh battery with VOOC 3.0 20W fast charging.

Oppo Ace 
In October 2019, Oppo released Reno Ace in China. Reno Ace powered by Qualcomm Snapdragon 855+ Soc has 6.5-inches AMOLED capacitive touchscreen which is protected by Gorilla Glass 6 technology. It also has two variant 8GB RAM with 128GB internal storage and 8GB with 256GB storage.The phone features Quad (48 MP + 13 MP + 8 MP + 2 MP) camera on the rear along with 16 MP selfie camera. It also packs a 4,000 mAh battery which recharges 100% in just 30 min by using 65W fast charging technology.

Oppo Reno3

Oppo Reno4

Oppo Reno5

Oppo Reno6

Oppo Reno7

Comparison of phones of Oppo

See also

 List of Android smartphones
 OnePlus, a smartphone subsidiary of Oppo. Both are owned by BBK Electronics

Notes
 Harga Hp OPPO A16 3/32 GB Terbaru 2023 & Spek

References 

 
Android (operating system) devices
Lists of mobile phones
CyanogenMod